Camillo Gabrielli (circa 1670 -1730) was an Italian painter of the late Baroque period.

He was a native of Pisa, was a scholar of Ciro Ferri. Lanzi states that he was the first who introduced the style of Pietro da Cortona among his countrymen. He painted some oil pictures at the Carmelites, and for private collections; but he was more distinguished for his fresco paintings, which were much esteemed. His principal work was the decorations of the great salon in the Palazzo Alliata in Forisportam and for the Palazzo del Consiglio dei Dodici in Pisa. He died in 1730. Among his pupils were Francesco and Giuseppe Melani.

Notes

References
 

1670 births
1730 deaths
17th-century Italian painters
18th-century Italian painters
Italian male painters
People from Pisa
Painters from Tuscany
Italian Baroque painters
18th-century Italian male artists